Mont-sur-Marchienne is a town of Wallonia and a district of the municipality of Charleroi, located in the province of Hainaut, Belgium.  

It was a municipality of its own before the merger of the municipalities in 1977.

Gallery

Sub-municipalities of Charleroi
Former municipalities of Hainaut (province)